Samuel W. Seymour, a lawyer, is of counsel at the firm of Sullivan & Cromwell LLP and former president of the New York City Bar Association.

Education
Seymour received his bachelor's degree from Dartmouth College in 1979, and his law degree from Columbia Law School in 1982.

Legal career
As a lawyer in Sullivan & Cromwell's Criminal Defense and Investigations Group, Seymour concentrates on white-collar criminal defense, regulatory enforcement matters and internal investigations.  He has represented clients in investigations involving allegations of accounting fraud, securities fraud, foreign bribery, price fixing, economic sanctions violations, money laundering and obstruction of justice.  He also handles derivative cases, shareholder actions and complex contract disputes.

Selected Cases
Seymour has handled the resolution of government investigations for clients including The Bank of New York, Spiegel, Inc., UBS, Bankers Trust Company, Statoil ASA, Moody's Investors Service, Assicurazioni Generali S.p.A., Banco Popular de Puerto Rico, Morgan Crucible plc, ABN AMRO Bank and Wachovia. He served as lead trial counsel in 15 criminal jury trials in federal courts, and argued several appeals in the Second Circuit.

New York City Bar Association
Seymour  began his two-year term as president of the New York City Bar Association in April 2010.  He had previously served as both a member and Chair of the Executive Committee, Vice President of the Association and Chair of the Board of the City Bar Justice Center.

See also
 Sullivan & Cromwell
 New York City Bar Association
 City Bar Justice Center

References

Living people
New York (state) lawyers
Dartmouth College alumni
Columbia Law School alumni
Presidents of the New York City Bar Association
Sullivan & Cromwell partners
Year of birth missing (living people)